Dominican Creole may refer to:

 Dominican Creoles, an ethnic group native to Saint-Domingue
 Dominican Creole French, a Creole language of Dominica

Language and nationality disambiguation pages